The Elite Round of the 2009 UEFA European Under-19 Championship is the second round of qualification. The winners of each group join hosts Ukraine at the Final Tournament.

Group 1

Group 2

Group 3

Group 4

Group 5

Group 6

Group 7

References

External links
Official website

Qualification Elite
UEFA European Under-19 Championship qualification